David or Dave Gibbons may also refer to:

David Gibbons (politician) (1927–2014), Bermudian politician and businessman
David Gibbons (figure skater) in 1998 United States Figure Skating Championships
David Gibbons (rugby league) in 1996 Leeds RLFC season
Dave Gibbons (born 1949), an English comic book artist.
Dave Gibbons (sailor) on B14

See also
David Gibbins (born 1962), archaeologist and writer